McFadden's Flats may refer to:
 McFadden's Flats (1927 film), an American silent film
 McFadden's Flats (1935 film), an American comedy film